Estrobin, also known as α,α-di(p-ethoxyphenyl)-β-phenylbromoethylene and commonly abbreviated as DBE, is a synthetic, nonsteroidal estrogen of the triphenylethylene group that was never marketed. Chlorotrianisene, and subsequently clomifene and tamoxifen, were derived from it. Estrobin, similarly to other triphenylethylenes, is very lipophilic and hence very long-lasting in its duration of action. Similarly to chlorotrianisene, estrobin behaves a prodrug to a much more potent estrogen in the body.

See also 
 Broparestrol
 Diethylstilbestrol
 M2613
 Stilbestrol
 Ethamoxytriphetol
 2,8-DHHHC

References 

Organobromides
Prodrugs
Selective estrogen receptor modulators
Synthetic estrogens
Triphenylethylenes